The Lordship and Barony of Hailes is a Scottish feudal lordship (a feudal barony of higher degree).

Hailes is traditionally believed to have been founded by an Englishman, taken prisoner in the reign of David II of Scotland, who was rewarded with the grant of lands in East Lothian for having rescued the Earl of Dunbar and March from an attacking horse.

Patrick de Dunbar, 9th Earl of March granted the Barony of Hailes to Adam de Hepburn (or Hibburne or Hyburne) in 1343 (thus the Hepburns held Hailes in heritage from the Earl of March, who in turn held it on behalf of the Crown); Hew Gourlay of Beinstoun having earlier forfeited the lands. On 20 December 1451, James II, King of Scots, granted Sir Patrick Hepburn, 1st Lord Hailes, and his heirs and assignees, the lands of the Lordship of Hailes, including Hailes Castle, and other lands, to be incorporated into the free barony of Hailes. Sir Patrick Hepburn was created a peer of the Parliament of Scotland under the title Lord Hailes in 1453.

The Lordship and Barony of Hailes remained in the Hepburn family until 20 December 1567 when it was forfeited to the Parliament of Scotland by James Hepburn, 4th Earl of Bothwell. On 1 October 1594, it was granted to Sir Walter Scott, 1st Lord Scott of Buccleuch, remaining with the Scott family until around the time of the Cromwellian invasion of Scotland in 1650 when it came into the possession of the Earls of Winton.  In 1692, the Lordship and Barony of Hailes was disponed by James Melville of Halhill to Sir David Dalrymple, advocate and remained in the Dalrymple family until 1876 when it was transferred to A.J. Balfour (later created The 1st Earl of Balfour).

The caput baronium (or simply "caput") of the Lordship and Barony of Hailes is Hailes Castle.

Barons of Hailes

Holders of the barony in heritage from Patrick de Dunbar, 9th Earl of March, who held it on behalf of the Crown:

Lords and Barons of Hailes

On 20 Dec 1451,  James II, King of Scots, granted the Lordship and Barony of Hailes to Sir Patrick Hepburn, thereby converting the Barony that had been held in heritage from the Earl of March into a Lordship and Barony granted by the King.

a: From 2003 until 2008, the Lordship and Barony of Hailes was held by the estate of the late Gerald Balfour, 4th Earl of Balfour

References

External links
 Electric Scotland Website
 Burkes Peerage Website

Feudalism in Scotland
Scottish society
Hailes
Hailes
Titles in Scotland
Lists of nobility
Noble titles
Scots law
Scotland